Pink plastic flamingos are a common lawn ornament in the United States made of plastic.

History

Union Products
The American artist Don Featherstone designed the pink lawn flamingo in 1957, naming the first Diego. His lawn flamingo, mass-produced by his employer, Union Products, of Leominster, Massachusetts, has since become an icon of pop culture that won him the Ig Nobel Prize for Art in 1996. It has even spawned a spoof lawn greeting industry that installs flocks of pink flamingos on a victim's lawn in the dark of night. After the release of John Waters's 1972 movie Pink Flamingos, plastic flamingos came to be the stereotypical example of lawn kitsch.

Many imitation products have found their way onto front lawns and store shelves since then. Genuine pink flamingos made by Union Products from 1987 (the 30th anniversary of the plastic flamingo) until 2001 can be identified by the signature of Don Featherstone on the rear underside. These official flamingos were sold in pairs, one standing upright and the other with its head low to the ground, "feeding". Sometime after Featherstone's retirement in 2000, Union Products began producing birds without the signature. In December 2001, the Annals of Improbable Research (bestowers of the Ig Nobel prize) teamed up with the Museum of Bad Art to protest this omission in the form of a boycott. Union Products stopped production of pink flamingos on November 1, 2006.

HMC International LLC
HMC International LLC, a subsidiary of Faster-Form Corporation, purchased the copyright and plastic molds of Featherstone's original plastic flamingos in 2007.  HMC sub-contracted production of the flamingos to Cado Manufacturing, Inc., a blow-molder located in Leominster, Massachusetts, who specialized in this type of production. In 2010, Cado Manufacturing purchased the copyrights and the entire Union Products product line, including the pink flamingo, from HMC.

Trivia
In 2009, the city of Madison, Wisconsin, Common Council designated the plastic flamingo as the city's official bird.  The city's soccer club, Forward Madison FC, uses the plastic flamingo on its logo.

Some homeowners associations forbid the installation of plastic flamingos and similar lawn ornaments, and will fine offending owners, on the basis that such decorations lower the neighborhood's real estate values.

In popular culture 
In the media and fiction, plastic flamingos are often used as a symbol of kitsch, bad taste and cheapness. The movie Pink Flamingos is named after them and helped them become an icon of trash and kitsch.

See also
Artificial turf
Lawn jockey

References 

 Published: October 19, 2006.
 Describes the change in design and calls for boycott.
 Published November 17, 2006 - Reflects on the shutdown of the original plastic-flamingo factory and the flamingo's impact on popular culture.

External links

Lawn flamingo fansite

Garden ornaments
Flamingos
Birds in popular culture
Novelty items
American culture